Dmitry Andreyevich Shomko (born 19 March 1990) is a Kazakh football player who plays for Kazakh club Aktobe and is part of the Kazakhstan national football team.

Career

Club
Shomko began his career in 2006 with FC Batyr Ekibastuz. He has been playing for Irtysh since 2009. He also played also the 2011/2012 season on loan for Irtysh's League rival Astana.
On 12 January 2021, Astana confirmed that Shomko had left the club following the expiration of his contract.

On 13 January 2021, Shomko signed with Russian Premier League club Rotor Volgograd.

On 2 July 2021, Aktobe announced the signing of Shomko.

International career 
He made his international debut for Kazakhstan in 2011.

Career statistics

Club

International

Statistics accurate as of match played 13 October 2018

International goals
Scores and results lists Kazakhstan's goals first

Honours 
Astana
 Kazakhstan Premier League (1): 2014
 Kazakhstan Super Cup (1): 2015

References

External links
KFF Profile

1990 births
Living people
Kazakhstani people of Russian descent
Kazakhstani footballers
Kazakhstan under-21 international footballers
Kazakhstan international footballers
Association football defenders
FC Irtysh Pavlodar players
FC Astana players
FC Rotor Volgograd players
Kazakhstan Premier League players
Russian Premier League players
Kazakhstani expatriate footballers
Expatriate footballers in Russia
People from Pavlodar Region